Morris High School may refer to several high schools in the United States:

Mark Morris High School, Longview, Washington
Morris Area High School, Morris, Minnesota
Morris Catholic High School, Denville, New Jersey
Morris Central School, Morris, New York
Morris High School (Illinois), Morris, Illinois
Morris High School (Oklahoma), Morris, Oklahoma
Morris High School (Bronx), Bronx, New York
Morris High School (Morris, Minnesota), listed on the NRHP in Minnesota
Morris Hills High School, Rockaway, New Jersey
Morris Knolls High School, Rockaway, New Jersey
Mount Morris Junior/Senior High School, Mount Morris, New York
West Morris Central High School, Chester, New Jersey
West Morris Mendham High School, Mendham Borough, New Jersey

See also
Morris High School Historic District, Bronx, New York